Olaf Falafel is a comedian and a children's author, who illustrates his own books, he is also the creator and presenter of Art Club an online Art channel for kids. He has been a stand-up comedian since 2012 and was also known for making humorous Vines, which he shared on Twitter, and some of which went viral, until uploading of videos from Vine to Twitter was suspended in 2016. His humour frequently involves puns and absurdity. He is a supporter of Luton Town Football Club.

Career

Falafel worked as an art director before becoming a comedian.

In 2014, he was nominated for the Laughing Horse Comedy Club's New Act of the Year competition. In 2017 he was included in both The Guardians and The Telegraphs rundowns of the funniest jokes of the Edinburgh Fringe. In 2018 Falafel was in Dave channel's, The Mirrors, The Evening Standards, The Scotsmans and i News's rundowns of the top jokes of the Edinburgh Fringe and won an award for his festival poster.

Falafel secured a three-book contract with HarperCollins in 2016, after asking for a publisher to approach him in a tweet.

In 2019, Falafel made headlines by winning the Best Joke of the Edinburgh Fringe. He took the title with the gag: "I keep randomly shouting out 'Broccoli' and 'Cauliflower' – I think I might have florets".

In 2020, Falafel signed a two-book deal with Walker books to illustrate Unleash Your Creative Monster a "funny and informative" guide to creative writing.

In 2021, off the back of his Art Club YouTube videos, Falafel signed a two-book deal with Puffin to create his first middle grade chapter books called Trixie Pickle Art Avenger about a child who becomes their school's version of Banksy.

In August 2022, Falafel had two jokes in the Best Joke of the Edinburgh Fringe Top Ten list.

Live Shows
 2015 – Expect the Unexporcupine (with Michael Stranney)
 2016 – Olaf Falafel and the Cheese of Truth
 2017 – The Marmosets of My Mind
 2018 – There's no I in Idiot
 2019 – Olaf Falafel Presents Knitting With Maracas
 2022 – Olaf Falafel's Super Stupid Show (family friendly show)
 2022 – Olaf Falafel STOAT

Books
 2017 – Old Macdonald Heard a Parp
 2017 – Father Christmas Heard a Parp
 2018 – Old Macdonald Heard a Parp from the Past
 2019 – It's One Giant Leek For Mankind
2021 – Unleash Your Creative Monster
2022 – Trixie Pickle Art Avenger
2022 – Blobfish

References

External links
Official website

Living people
British stand-up comedians
Year of birth missing (living people)